Shahrabad may refer to:
Shahrabad, Kerman
Shahrabad, alternate name of Shirabad, Maneh and Samalqan, North Khorasan Province
Shahrabad-e Khavar, North Khorasan Province
Shahrabad-e Kord, North Khorasan Province
Shahrabad, Qazvin
Shahrabad, Razavi Khorasan
Shahrabad, Davarzan, Razavi Khorasan Province
Shahrabad, Mashhad, Razavi Khorasan Province
Shahrabad, Nishapur, Razavi Khorasan Province
Shahrabad, Torbat-e Jam, Razavi Khorasan Province
Shahrabad, Tehran
Shahrabad, Abarkuh, Yazd Province
Shahrabad, Bafq, Yazd Province
Shahrabad-e Ilat
Shahrabad District
Shahrabad Rural District (disambiguation)